Amity, Pennsylvania, is the name of two unincorporated communities:

 Amity, Bucks County, Pennsylvania
 Amity, Washington County, Pennsylvania

See also
 Amity Township, Berks County, Pennsylvania
 Amity Township, Erie County, Pennsylvania